Yeşiloba (literally "green nomad encampment" in Turkish) may refer to the following places in Turkey:

 Yeşiloba, Bekilli, a village in the district of Bekilli, Denizli Province, also known as Medele
 Yeşiloba, Beşiri, a village in the district of Beşiri, Batman Province
 Yeşiloba, Korkuteli, a village in the district of Korkuteli, Antalya Province